NGC 7331 Group is a visual grouping of galaxies in the constellation Pegasus.  Spiral galaxy NGC 7331 is a foreground galaxy in the same field as the collection, which is also called the Deer Lick Group. It contains four other members, affectionately referred to as the "fleas": the lenticular or unbarred spirals NGC 7335 and NGC 7336, the barred spiral galaxy NGC 7337 and the elliptical galaxy NGC 7340. These galaxies lie at distances of approximately 332, 365, 348 and 294 million light years, respectively. Although adjacent on the sky, this collection is not a galaxy group, as NGC 7331 itself is not gravitationally associated with the far more distant "fleas"; indeed, even they are separated by far more than the normal distances (~2 Mly) of a galaxy group.

See also
 Stephan's Quintet, another visual grouping that is not (purely) a galaxy group. Ironically, its non-group member, NGC 7320, might be a member of a true NGC 7331 group, having a similar redshift to that nearby galaxy.
 Wild's Triplet
 Zwicky's Triplet
 Robert's Quartet
 Seyfert's Sextet, another visual grouping that is not (purely) a galaxy group, as one galaxy is a gravitationally unbound background object and another galaxy a tidal tail of stars.
 Copeland Septet

External links
 
 ADS: The NGC 7331 Group, a Stable Group of Galaxies Projected on Stephan's Quartet
 
 
 3–10 October 2008: Andromeda Galaxy (M31), Gamma Andromedae, and the NGC 7331 Group on Astronomy.com blog 
 NGC 7331 Group at de-regt.com

References

 
Galaxy clusters
Pegasus (constellation)